The Allan Stewart Tapes was a television comedy series which aired on 1979 on Scottish Television. It starred Allan Stewart, alongside Jack Douglas who played his butler living in a penthouse flat overlooking Edinburgh Castle.

According to the Lost UK TV Shows website, the programme is missing, believed wiped, making it a very late example of wiping.

Transmissions
Scottish Television broadcast the series over December 1979, at 19.30 
 Episode 1–1 December 
 Episode 2–8 December 
 Episode 3–15 December 
 Episode 4–22 December 
 Episode 5–29 December

The rest of the ITV network broadcast the series every Tuesday at 3.45 from 29 April until 27 May 1980.

References

External links
The Allan Stewart Tapes on IMDb

1979 Scottish television series debuts
1979 Scottish television series endings
1970s Scottish television series
Lost television shows
Television shows produced by Scottish Television
English-language television shows
1970s British comedy television series